Tenna Kappel Bendtsen (born 20 March 1992), known as Tenna Kappel, is a Danish footballer who plays as a midfielder and captains Women's 1st Division club Odense Q. She has been a member of the Denmark women's national team.

International career
Kappel capped for Denmark at senior level during two Algarve Cup editions (2014 and 2015).

References

1992 births
Living people
Danish women's footballers
Women's association football midfielders
Odense Q players

Denmark women's international footballers